The Great Western Hospital is a large hospital in Swindon, Wiltshire, England, near junction 15 of the M4 motorway. It opened in 2002 and is run by the Great Western Hospitals NHS Foundation Trust.

History 
The original hospital in Swindon was the Princess Margaret Hospital, in the Okus suburb to the south of the town, which started providing services to patients in 1960 but was not formally opened by Princess Margaret until April 1966. It has since been fully demolished.

The new hospital was procured under a Private Finance Initiative contract to replace the services previously provided at the Princess Margaret Hospital and St Margaret's Hospital at Stratton St Margaret in 1999. The architect for the new hospital was Whicheloe Macfarlane, who designed the hospital with a concrete frame. It was built by Carillion at a cost of £148 million; it started providing services to patients in 2002 and was formally opened by HRH Prince Philip on 28 February 2003.

Facilities 
The facilities at the hospital include an accident and emergency department, an acute assessment unit, a twelve bedded intensive care / high dependency unit, a maternity unit, an intermediate care centre on site, a health and social care education centre called the Academy, and a wide range of wards and clinics, serving approximately 300,000 people.

See also
 Healthcare in Wiltshire
 List of hospitals in England
 List of NHS trusts

References

External links
 

Hospital buildings completed in 2002
NHS hospitals in England
Buildings and structures in Swindon
Hospitals in Wiltshire
2002 establishments in England